Home Sweet Home is a 1917 British silent film directed by Wilfred Noy.

Cast
 Rita Otway 
 Manning Haynes 
 Thomas Canning

Plot

Safety Mulraney (Otway), a down-on-her luck cooper, receives the world's largest barrel order from Russian brewer Itrivvik Macedonia (Haynes). However, Lenin (Canning) has ill intentions.

References

Bibliography
 Low, Rachael. History of the British Film, 1914-1918. Routledge, 2005.

External links

1917 films
1917 drama films
British drama films
1910s English-language films
Films directed by Wilfred Noy
British silent feature films
British black-and-white films
1910s British films
Silent drama films